= Gualtherus Johannes Kolff =

Dutch founder of the library for the blind

Gualtherus Johannes Kolff (Rotterdam, 31 January 1846 – The Hague, 14 October 1918) was the founder of the Dutch Library for the Blind.
